Kotellets (Fr.  „chop“, from Fr.  resp. Lat.  „rib“), also known as Koteletts, Karree, Karbonade or cutlets, are a German meat dish made of slices of meat from the rib area, including the bone. The piece of rib is found on both sides of the spine behind the neck. Koteletts are typically offered from pork, veal and mutton, but they can also come from beef.

Usually, koteletts are served either roasted or grilled, but in some cases they are also served breaded (cf. breaded cutlet).

Kinds of meat used for koteletts

Pork 
The part where the koteletts are taken from reach from the front to the hind leg. Due to the proximity to the neck, koteletts taken from the front are also known as "Nackenkotelett" (lit. neck kotelett) in Germany or "Halskotelett" in Switzerland. The middle ones are known as "Stielkotelett" or "Rippenkotelett" (lit. rib kotelett) due to the long and closely fitting rib cage. The hind koteletts, including parts of the fillet, are known as "Lummerkotelett", "Lendenkotelett" or "Filetkotelett" (lit. loin kotelett or fillet kotelett) in Germany or "Nierenstück" (en. loin) in Switzerland. These hind koteletts are especially low on bones and fat.

Veal 
Only the front part of the ribs are used to make koteletts when speaking of veal. The hind part of the ribs is typically sold without the bones.

Mutton 
Similarly to the veal, koteletts from mutton are taken from the front or middle part of the ribs only.

Beef 
The front kotelett of the beef is known as "Hochrippe" (lit. high ribs) and is usually used as boiled beef, goulash or, without the bones, as steak. The hind kotelett or the beef is known in two variants: with ribs and without. Together with the fillet, it is similar to the t-bone steak. Without bones, it is also sold as Roastbeef or rump steak.

Fish 
In some instances, the slices of fish with several centimeters of thickness that are cut vertically from the spine are known as koteletts as well. They are typically cut from bigger fish such as cod.

Trivia 
In Switzerland, the popular Cervelat sausage is also known as the kotelett of the laborer.

Dish variants

See also 

 Cotoletta
 Veal Milanese
 Milanesa
 Piccata
 Scaloppine
 Escalope
 Kotlet schabowy
 Schnitzel 
 Wiener Schnitzel
 Tonkatsu

References 

Austrian cuisine
Beef dishes
German meat dishes
Pork dishes
Swiss cuisine
Veal dishes